Caucalis pumila may refer to two different taxa of plants:
 Caucalis pumila Willd., a synonym for Daucus carota subsp. maritimus (Lam.) Batt. 
 Caucalis pumila L., a synonym for Daucus pumilus (L.) Hoffmanns. & Link